A road apple is a term for animal feces, often on a road and/or from a horse.

Road apple may also refer to:
 Road Apples (album), an album by The Tragically Hip
 The Road Apples, a 1970s one-hit wonder
 Road apple (computer), models of Macintosh computers with a particularly bad technical design according to Low End Mac
 Road apple (social engineering), removable media with malicious software left in opportunistic or conspicuous places